Idar Lars Ulstein (2 April 1934 – 29 April 2012) was a Norwegian businessperson.

He was educated as a naval architect at the Norwegian Institute of Technology in Trondheim, Norway. After completion of his education in 1962, he entered the family business Ulstein Group, and was manager of the company until he retired as chief executive in 1997. He then served as chairman of the board until 2011.

Idar Ulstein was a member of the Norwegian Academy of Technological Sciences, and was appointed Knight, First Class of the Order of St. Olav for his "service to Norwegian industry". In 2010, he was awarded the OSJ Lifetime Achievement Award.

References

External links
 Ulstein Group published their 90 years of history in 2007. In this book, Idar Ulstein is quoted and referred to. 
 Idar Ulstein recognised for lifetime achievement. 

1934 births
2012 deaths
People from Møre og Romsdal
Norwegian Institute of Technology alumni
Norwegian businesspeople
Members of the Norwegian Academy of Technological Sciences